The 2022–23 season is the 124th season in the existence of Leyton Orient Football Club and the club's fourth consecutive season in League Two. In addition to the league, they will also compete in the 2022–23 FA Cup, the 2022–23 EFL Cup and the 2022–23 EFL Trophy.

Transfers

In

Out

Loans in

Loans out

Pre-season and friendlies
The O's announced, on 10 May, that they would head to Moncarapacho in Portugal for a week-long training camp between 2 and 9 July. Walthamstow revealed a match with Leyton Orient on 19 May. A day later, lower-league Potters Bar Town announced a home pre-season match with The O's. On 24 May, Orient confirmed their pre-season schedule with additional friendlies against Haringey Borough, Maidstone United, Portsmouth and Dagenham & Redbridge. On June 17, Orient announced their pre-season training would include a behind closed doors meeting with West Bromwich Albion. Three days later, a home friendly against Tottenham Hotspur U21s was added to the pre-season schedule. Another training camp friendly in Portugal was confirmed, against Peterborough United.

On 5 January, Orient announced they would travel to Welling United for a mid-season friendly, to gain extra match minutes.

Competitions

Overall record

League Two

League table

Results summary

Results by round

Matches

On 23 June, the league fixtures were announced.

FA Cup

Leyton Orient were drawn away to Crewe Alexandra in the first round.

EFL Cup

Orient were drawn away to Forest Green Rovers in the first round.

EFL Trophy

On June 23, the group stage draw was finalised.

Player statistics

Appearances and goals
Players listed with no appearances have been in the matchday squad but only as unused substitutes.

|-
! colspan="14" style="background:#dcdcdc; text-align:center"| Goalkeepers

|-
! colspan="14" style="background:#dcdcdc; text-align:center"| Defenders

|-
! colspan="14" style="background:#dcdcdc; text-align:center"| Midfielders

|-
! colspan="14" style="background:#dcdcdc; text-align:center"| Forwards

|-
! colspan="14" style="background:#dcdcdc; text-align:center"| Out on Loan

|-
! colspan="14" style="background:#dcdcdc; text-align:center"| Left during the Season

|-

Top scorers
Includes all competitive matches. The list is sorted by squad number when total goals are equal.

Last updated 18 March 2023

References

Leyton Orient
Leyton Orient F.C. seasons
Leyton Orient
Leyton Orient